Prosopochaeta nitidiventris is a species of fly in the family Tachinidae described by Pierre-Justin-Marie Macquart in 1851.

Distribution
Argentina, Chile.

References 

Diptera of South America
Dexiinae
Taxa named by Pierre-Justin-Marie Macquart
Insects described in 1851